Bevanism was a movement on the left wing of the Labour Party in the late 1950s led by Aneurin Bevan which also included Richard Crossman, Michael Foot and Barbara Castle. Bevanism was opposed by the Gaitskellites, moderate social democrats within the party. The Gaitskellites typically won most of the battles inside Parliament, but Bevanism was stronger among local Labour activists. The Bevanites split over the issue of nuclear weapons, and the movement faded away after Bevan died in 1960.

History 
Bevanism was influenced by Marxism; Bevan's biographer and later Leader of the Labour Party Michael Foot said that Bevan's "belief in the class conflict stayed unshaken", while acknowledging that Bevan was not a traditional Marxist. Despite declaring inspiration from Karl Marx, Bevan did not visibly support insurrectionist concepts of proletarian revolution, arguing that revolution depended on the circumstances, or the typical organisational model of many Communist parties. According to Ed Balls, Bevan and his supporters instead preferred a strident but pluralist conception of democratic socialism, tempered by pragmatic sensibilities and practical application.

The Bevanite Group of MPs, of which there were about three dozen, coalesced following Bevan's resignation from the Cabinet in 1951 when the health service started charging for previously free services such as spectacles in order to help pay for Britain's involvement in the Korean War. Bevanites Harold Wilson and John Freeman resigned with Bevan himself. The group in Parliament drew heavily from the previous "Keep Left" group, which had previously dissented from the pro-American foreign policy of the 1945–1951 Labour government favoured by Clement Attlee, his Foreign Secretary Ernest Bevin and Hugh Gaitskell. According to Crossman in December 1951 the group was not organised, and Bevan could not be persuaded to have any consistent or coherent strategy, but they did have a group who met regularly and liked each other and came to represent "real Socialism" to a large number of Party members. Picture Post called them the "Bevanly Host" in April 1952.

Local organisations 
Bevanites organised in Constituency Labour Parties across Britain, and set up local discussion groups known as "Brains Trusts", also a legacy of the "Keep Left" group.

Brains Trusts organised in support of the newspaper favoured by Bevanites, Tribune magazine, allocating left-wing MPs and campaigners to form speaking panels around the country. Tribune itself provided an important print voice for Bevanite politicians and was in wide circulation.

Objectives 
The main Bevanite objectives were:

State ownership of the "commanding heights of the economy". Many nationalisations had made up the bedrock of Labour's previous manifestos, such as "Let us face the future". Bevanites' views towards nationalisation mirrored those of Vladimir Lenin, in that state control was only seen as necessary in the context of exchange or distribution, as opposed to the total and immediate appropriation of as much private property as possible.
 A comprehensive and completely free 'cradle to grave' system of welfare, health provision and education.
 Housing for all.
 Full employment.
The nationalisation of the steel industry, contrary to the views of many colleagues.
 Contempt for dogma as a modus operandi; an open-minded approach to democratic socialism.
 Respect for the arts.
 General unwillingness to yield upon the perceived gains made since 1945, for example, opposition to means testing for social security benefits, and opposition to prescription charges as military spending increased.
 A complementary ability to drop unpopular policies.
 Freedom of debate, opinion and criticism within the Labour Party.
 Scepticism towards most American foreign policy, especially the Southeast Asia Treaty Organization and West German rearmament.
 Anti-fascism, anti-apartheid sentiment, and support for decolonisation internationally.
 Greater industrial democracy and workers' control of nationalized industries, which Bevan believed were governed unconstitutionally due to their lack of public accountability.

Party role 
Historian Kenneth O. Morgan says. "Bevan alone kept the flag of left-wing socialism aloft throughout – which gave him a matchless authority amongst the constituency parties and in party conference." At the 1952 Labour Party Conference, Bevanites were elected to six of the seven places on the National Executive Committee by constituency representatives.

Split over nuclear disarmament 
Later in his political career, Bevan began advocating the maintenance of Britain's nuclear deterrent, against those who became associated with the Campaign for Nuclear Disarmament (CND), saying that without them a future British foreign secretary would be going "naked into the conference chamber." This split the Bevanites; many, such as leading Bevanite Michael Foot, continued to oppose Britain's nuclear weapons, with Labour's 1983 manifesto under Foot's leadership of the party calling for unilateral nuclear disarmament.

See also 

 History of the British Labour Party
 Political history of the United Kingdom (1945–present)
 Tony Benn
 Barbara Castle
 Richard Crossman
 Tom Driberg
 Jennie Lee, Baroness Lee of Asheridge
 Ian Mikardo
 George Thomas, 1st Viscount Tonypandy

References

Further reading 
 Foote, Geoffrey. "The Bevanite Left" in Foote, ed., The Labour Party’s Political Thought. Palgrave Macmillan UK, 1997, pp. 260–278.
 Jenkins, Mark. Bevanism, Labour's High Tide: The Cold War and the Democratic Mass Movement (Spokesman Press, 1979).
 Jobson, Richard. "'Waving the Banners of a Bygone Age', Nostalgia and Labour's Clause IV Controversy, 1959–60." Contemporary British History 27.2 (2013): 123–144.
 Steck, Henry J. "Grassroots Militants & Ideology: The Bevanite Revolt." Polity 2.4 (1970): 426–442.

Labour Party (UK) factions
History of the Labour Party (UK)
Eponymous political ideologies
Social democracy
Democratic socialism
1950s in the United Kingdom
Types of socialism